Mordellistena coomani is a beetle in the genus Mordellistena of the family Mordellidae. It was described in 1923 by Píc.

References

coomani
Beetles described in 1923